Mehndi is a form of body art and temporary skin decoration originating in ancient Egypt, usually drawn on hands or legs. They are decorative designs that are created on a person's body, using a paste, created from the powdered dry leaves of the henna plant (Lawsonia inermis). It is a popular form of body art in South Asia and resembles similar traditions of henna as body art found in North Africa, East Africa and the Middle East. There are many different names for mehndi across the languages of South Asia. In the West, mehndi is commonly known as henna tattoo, although it is not actually a tattoo as only the surface of the skin is inked. Henna has been used as a dye for the skin since ancient times.

There are many variations and designs. Women usually apply mehndi designs to their hands and feet, though some, including cancer patients and women with alopecia occasionally decorate their scalps. The standard color of henna is brown, but other design colors such as white, red, black and gold are sometimes used.

Mehndi in Indian tradition is typically applied during Hindu weddings and festivals like Karva Chauth, Vat Purnima, Diwali, Bhai Dooj, Navraatri, Durga Pooja and Teej. Muslims in South Asia also apply mehndi during Muslim weddings as well as festivals such as Eid-ul-Fitr and Eid-ul-Adha.

In Hindu and Sikh festivals, women often have henna applied to their hands, feet and sometimes the backs of their shoulders. Conversely, men usually have it applied on their arms, legs, back, and chest. For women, it is usually drawn on their palms, backs of their hands and on feet, where the design will be clearest due to contrast with the lighter skin on these surfaces, which naturally contains less of the pigment melanin.

Likely due to the desire for a "tattoo-black" appearance, some people add the synthetic dye p-Phenylenediamine (PPD) to henna to give it a black colour. PPD may cause moderate to severe allergic reactions when applied to skin.

Etymology
The origin of "mehndi" is from the Sanskrit word "mendhika," which refers to a plant that releases a red dye. According to A Dictionary of Urdu, Classical Hindi and English Mehndi also refers to "the marriage-feast on the occasion of the bride's hands and feet being stained with henna."

Origins
The use of mehndi has its origins in the ancient Middle East and Indian subcontinent where it was used in civilizations such as Babylon and ancient Egypt. It was prevalent in fourth century in India, which is evident from cave art in the Deccan, specifically in the Ajanta Caves.

Tradition

Mehndi is a ceremonial art form common in India, Pakistan, Bangladesh, and Afghanistan. It is typically applied during weddings for Sikh, Muslim and Hindu brides. In Rajasthan, the grooms are given designs that are often as elaborate as those for brides. In Assam, apart from marriage, it is broadly used by unmarried women during rongali bihu.

Process
Mehndi paste is usually applied to the skin using a plastic cone, a paintbrush or a stick. After about 15 to 20 minutes, the mud will dry and begin to crack, and during this time, a mixture of lemon juice and white sugar can be applied over the henna design to remoisten the henna mud so that the henna will stain darker. The painted area is then wrapped with tissue, plastic, or medical tape to lock in body heat, creating a more intense colour on the skin. The wrap (not a traditional method), is worn for two to six hours, or sometimes overnight, and then removed. When first removed, the henna design is pale to dark orange in colour and gradually darkens through oxidation, over the course of 24 to 72 hours. The final color is reddish brown and can last anywhere from one to three weeks depending on the quality and type of henna paste applied, as well as where it was applied on the body (thicker skin stains darker and longer than thin skin). Moisturizing with natural oils, such as olive, sesame seed, or coconut, will also help extend the lifetime of the stain. Skin exfoliation, salt water and chlorine in swimming pools can cause the henna tattoo to fade.

In weddings

Example of a wedding tradition
The mehndi, a dye produced from a mehndi plant, would be delivered by the groom's relatives on a silver tray containing two burning candles. Before the application of the henna, the guests would throw coins over the bride's head as a symbol of fertility. Then, the bride's soon to be mother-in-law would then bring out a piece of silk cloth as a gift to the bride. The bride would then walk along the unrolled piece of silk cloth in the direction of her future mother-in-law and kiss her hand. 

Once this is done, fruits, nuts, and pastries would be brought out and songs would be sung in hopes of making the bride cry. This was done because it was thought that the bride's crying would bring good luck. The bride would then sit on a cushion while her mother-in-law placed a gold coin in her hand as another sign of good luck. Once the bride was given the gold coin, the henna would be applied.

The person who applied the henna was always someone who was already known to be happily married; that person would apply the henna onto the bride's palms, fingers, and toes. The henna was made from dried henna leaves, and the process of application took a long time. For this reason, it was suggested that it be applied between thirty-two and forty-eight hours before the wedding so that it may have enough time to stain the skin. In addition to the bride, most women at the mehndi ceremony also apply the henna to their hands for aesthetics.

Popular mehndi patterns

Arabic mehndi designs
This pattern is drawn on the palm. Generally it starts from one corner of the wrist and ends at finger tip on the opposite corner. Vine, lace, flowers are the main elements of this pattern.

Mandala mehndi designs
Mandala is a geometric configuration of symbols used in various spiritual traditions including Hinduism, Buddhism, Jainism and Shinto. Various configurations of Mandala are drawn on the center of palm in this mehndi pattern.

See also
 Henna
 Alta
 Body painting
 Temporary tattoo

References

Body art
Hindu wedding rituals
South Asian culture
Indian wedding
Marriage in Pakistan
Nepalese art
Articles containing video clips
Marriage in Nepal